Wallbox is a smart electric vehicle charging and energy management provider which designs, manufactures and distributes electric vehicle charging technologies.

History 
Wallbox was founded in Barcelona, Spain by Enric Asunción and Eduard Castañeda in 2015 initially using the name Wall Box Chargers. In 2017, Wallbox came first in South Summit, a European startup competition. Wallbox then came in third place at the Startup World Cup in May 2018. In October 2019, Wallbox created Quasar, the world’s first bidirectional charger for the residential segment. Quasar was named the Best of CES in January 2020.

On June 9, 2021, Wallbox announced a merger with the special-purpose acquisition company Kensington Capital Acquisition Corp. II. The company will raise about $330 million from a range of investors, including Janus Henderson Investors, Luxor Capital, Cathay Innovation and Kensington Capital Partners. The deal closed on October 4, 2021.  Wallbox’s shares are listed on the New York Stock Exchange under the symbol WBX.

During Super Bowl LVI, Wallbox was the first EV charging company to ever run an ad during the game.

Awards 

 Red Dot Design Award 2019 - Red Dot GmbH & Co. KG
 Best of CES 2020 - Electrek
 Best of CES 2020 - Newsweek
 Best of CES 2020 - Robb Report
 Best Transportation Technology CES 2020 - Engadget
 2020 World Changing Ideas Finalist - Fast Company
 Edison Awards, Silver Winner 2020 - Edison Awards
 GOOD DESIGN Award 2021 -The Chicago Athenaeum Museum of Architecture and Design
 Excellent Product Design – Automotive Parts and Accessories German Design Award 2021 – German Design Council
 2021 World Changing Ideas Finalist - Fast Company
 2021 Good Design Award

References 

W
Electric vehicles